Silica is an unincorporated community in Saint Louis County, Minnesota, United States.

The community is located immediately south of the city of Hibbing at the intersection of State Highway 73 (MN 73) and Saint Louis County Road 440 (Mattson Road).  The West Swan River flows through the community.

The boundary line between Itasca and Saint Louis counties is nearby.

References

 Rand McNally Road Atlas – 2007 edition – Minnesota entry
 Official State of Minnesota Highway Map – 2011/2012 edition

Unincorporated communities in Minnesota
Unincorporated communities in St. Louis County, Minnesota